Elinor Caplan  (born May 20, 1944) is a businesswoman and former politician in Ontario, Canada. She served in the Legislative Assembly of Ontario from 1985 to 1997, and was a Member of Parliament in the House of Commons of Canada from 1997 to 2004. A Liberal, she served as a cabinet minister in the provincial government of David Peterson and the federal government of Jean Chrétien.

Background
She was born in Toronto to Samuel S. Hershorn, a textile manufacturer, and his wife Thelma (Goodman) Hershorn, both of whose families had come to Canada from Russian Poland. Caplan attended Oakwood Collegiate Institute in Toronto, and then Centennial College. She then worked in real estate heading Elinor Caplan and Associates from 1973 to 1978. Her husband, Wilfred, sought election to the provincial legislature in the 1977 election, but was defeated. Caplan is Jewish, and is a longtime member of Canadian Hadassah-WIZO, a women's Zionist organization.

Politics

Municipal
She ran for office in 1978, when she was elected to the North York municipal council as an alderman.

Provincial
She ran for the provincial legislature in the 1981 election, but lost to Progressive Conservative David Rotenberg in the constituency of Wilson Heights.

She was elected to the Ontario legislature in the 1985 election, defeating Progressive Conservative incumbent John Williams by over 4,000 votes in the North York riding of Oriole.  The Liberal Party formed a minority government after this election, and Caplan was appointed as Chair of the Management Board of Cabinet on June 26, 1985. She resigned her portfolio on June 16, 1986, following accusations of a conflict of interest relating to her husband's business dealings; while protesting her innocence, she claimed she had lost the confidence of the house. Caplan was subsequently exonerated by a parliamentary commission.

Caplan won a landslide re-election victory in the provincial election of 1987, She was reappointed to Peterson's cabinet on September 29, 1987 as Minister of Health. She held this position until the Liberals were defeated by the Ontario New Democratic Party in the 1990 election. Caplan defeated NDP candidate Lennox Farrell by just over 2,000 votes in the 1990 campaign, and remained a prominent figure in the official opposition, serving as Deputy House Leader in 1994-95.

In the 1995 election, Caplan narrowly retained her seat against a challenge from Progressive Conservative Paul Sutherland. She served as Chief Opposition Whip from 1995 to 1996, and retired from the legislature on May 1, 1997.  (She was succeeded as the MPP for Oriole by her son, David Caplan, who went on to serve as a cabinet minister in the government of Dalton McGuinty.)  In 1996, she supported Joseph Cordiano for the leadership of the Ontario Liberal Party.

Provincial Cabinet posts

Federal politics
Caplan was elected to the federal House of Commons in the 1997 election, defeating her closest opponent by more than 14,000 votes in the riding of Thornhill.  She served as parliamentary secretary to the Minister of Health in 1998-99, and was appointed to cabinet as Minister of Citizenship and Immigration on August 3, 1999.

There was some speculation that Caplan would be challenged by David Rotenberg in the 2000 federal election, but this ultimately came to nothing.  Facing an inexperienced opponent from the Canadian Alliance, she was easily re-elected. After a cabinet shuffle on January 15, 2002, Caplan was appointed Minister of National Revenue. She was dropped from cabinet when Paul Martin replaced Chrétien as Prime Minister in December 2003. She did not seek re-election in the 2004 election.

Federal Cabinet posts

After politics
In late 2004, Ontario Premier Dalton McGuinty appointed Caplan to lead a provincial inquiry into the state of home-care medical services.

References

External links

1944 births
Women government ministers of Canada
Women members of the House of Commons of Canada
Businesspeople from Toronto
Centennial College alumni
Canadian monarchists
Canadian people of Polish-Jewish descent
Canadian Zionists
Jewish Canadian politicians
Liberal Party of Canada MPs
Living people
Members of the 26th Canadian Ministry
Members of the Executive Council of Ontario
Members of the House of Commons of Canada from Ontario
Members of the King's Privy Council for Canada
Ontario Liberal Party MPPs
Politicians from Toronto
Women MPPs in Ontario
20th-century Canadian women politicians
21st-century Canadian women politicians
Jewish women politicians